Casalnuovo di Napoli is an Italian comune (municipality) in the Metropolitan City of Naples in the Italian region Campania, located about  northeast of Naples.

The municipality of Casalnuovo di Napoli contains the frazioni (hamlets) of: Casarea, Tavernanova, Licignano and Talona.

Casalnuovo di Napoli borders the following municipalities: Acerra, Afragola, Casoria, Pollena Trocchia, Pomigliano d'Arco, Sant'Anastasia, Volla, Somma Vesuviana .

The municipal capital stands on the ruins of Archora, one of the villages that had given rise to the neighboring city of Afragola , and also includes the suppressed municipality of Licignano di Napoli, corresponding to the Roman settlement of Licinianum.
It also includes the towns of Tavernanova and Casarea, acquired in 1929 by spin-off from the municipalities of Pomigliano d'Arco and Afragola.
From an ecclesiastical point of view, instead, the parishes are divided between the archdiocese of Naples (city centre and Casarea fraction), the diocese of Acerra (Licignano and Talona fraction) and the diocese of Nola (Tavernanova fraction).

History 
The town rises on the ruins of Archora, one of the villages from which the city of Afragola originated. At the beginning of the 15th century the village was acquired by the baron Giovanni III de Alexandro, belonging to the House D'Alessandro, who lived between Terra di Lavoro and Naples. This baron was also known as the Grand Chamberlain of Calabria (1415) and Marshal of the Kingdom and then he was the Counsellor of Queen Giovanna II. In 1484, Angiolo Como was granted the ruins of the village by Ferdinando II of Aragon, and on these ruins he built a new place, which was recognized as one of the houses of the diocese of Naples with the name of Casalnuovo, since it formerly constituted a farmhouse of Naples.

With the urban reform of Gioacchino Murat, the farmhouses of Casalnuovo and Salice, together with the farmhouse of Arcopinto (which today is divided into three municipalities) and the farmhouse of Afragola, merged into the commune of Afragola. The municipal territory of Casalnuovo was enlarged by Royal Decree of 25 February 1929, n. 316[2], with the consolidation of the then municipality of Licignano di Napoli, and the addition of parts of the territory belonging to the municipalities of Afragola and Pomigliano d'Arco. During the administrative redesign wanted by fascism, Licignano, after having been part of different municipalities, became a small fraction of Casalnuovo di Napoli.

In the 1950s, due to the divestiture of some territories of San Sebastiano al Vesuvio, the hamlets of Tavernanova and Casarea were added to the municipality of Casalnuovo, while the area called Botteghelle, between Casalnuovo and Tavernanova, continued to be part of the municipality of Afragola until the 1970s. In the late 1990s, the municipality of Casalnuovo obtained an additional portion of territory which used to be part of Afragola, because of the compensatory programme on the environmental impact determined by the high-speed railway station of Afragola on the neighbouring municipalities.

Economy

Factories 
in the past, Casalnuovo di Napoli, was one of the main industrial centres of the Neapolitan hinterland, thanks to some companies which had their own factories here. Among the most important companies, there were: Moneta, Eridania, Colussi and Liquigas and Hensemberger (accumulators industry), whose factories are now almost abandoned. However, there are several small and medium-sized enterprises operating in the textile and footwear sector in town, as shown by the presence (in the former Colussi factory) of the "Polo della Moda", which represents one of the main poles of the textile industry in all the Campania region. Another very important one, is the well-known men's tailoring company ISAIA, which today mainly produces men's high fashion clothes. Over the years, the company has experienced a great process of industrialization to such an extent that they began exporting their garments abroad, as a matter of fact the company not only boasts shops in Italy, but also abroad. Therefore, at the entrance of the town, on the welcome message, the city is given the title of "city of fashion" in memory of the tailors of great skill who resided here and to those ones who still work in town.

Religious traditions 

The city has many parishes, but also chapels, the main ones: San Giacomo Apostolo il Maggiore (patron saint) and San Nicola di Bari (Patron of Licignano). In addition to the Catholic churches there are also some Christian evangelical churches and a hall of the Kingdom of Jehovah's Witnesses. The city also has a second patron: San Biagio, celebrated on February 3. Many traditions are linked to this date. In the first place the typical one of the country, also for the other patrons, to bring the statue of the saint in procession through the city. San Biagio is protector of the throat and pets. On 3 February, the faithful take the animals to the church to be blessed, or they go to the church to be blessed with holy oil.
Officially, however, San Biagio is not the patron saint of the city, like San Giacomo. In fact it is called "patorno di Passaggio", the legend says that the statue of the saint, carried by a cart, was directed to Cancello and Arnone, but the cart wheel broke right in front of the village church, a testimony, for the faithful, that the saint did not want to leave the country. Since then the statue has been kept in the church where it was first sheltered.

The majority of the population is of Catholic orientation, but there are also substantial communities of Jehovah's Witnesses and Protestant, and in minimal percentage Sunni Muslims.

Events 

Calici e Cotone food and wine and artisan Kermesse with the participation of artists of national interest. Literary Prize Una Città Che Scrive. The winning texts of the first edition (2017) are contained in an anthology entitled "Una Città Che Scrive. Una Città che rinasce". Special Section of the Prize for the areas affected by the earthquake of 2016: VISSO NEL CUORE. The City of Casalnuovo for the areas affected by earthquake. Una città che scrive – A project realized with the contribution of the Bureau of the City Council in favour of the image of the City - Antology of 14 authors of Casalnuovo- Literary prize UNA CITTA' CHE SCRIVE- www.unacittachescrive.it - 2018 edition of the Prize:  Special section for dyslexia. Presentation of the Prize in Milan in the prestigious location of SAMSUNG.

Monuments and places of interest 
 Church of San Giacomo Apostolo
 Church of San Nicola Di Bari
 Church of Santa Maria Dell'arcora
 Church of Maria Ss. Addolorata
 Church of the Visitation of Mary
 Church of Santa Maria Delle Grazie
 Church of Maria Ss. Annunziata
 Palazzo Gaudiosi in via Nazionale delle Puglie, former Benedictine Convent bought by Duke Filippo Gaudiosi in the early 1800s after the suppression of the Monasteries and donated to his nephew Don Pasquale, transforming it into a domus for the holiday with adjoining noble chapel dedicated to the Madonna of Santa Maria ad Nives.
 Bronze bust of Giacomo Leopardi, made by the master Domenico Sepe. The bust embellishes the spaces of the small Social Library founded in 2019 by Giovanni Nappi and managed by the Association "A City That ...". The Library is named after Giacomo Leopardi to celebrate the bicentenary of the famous poem L'Infinito, which celebrates 200 years in 2019. 
 At "Corso Umberto" there is the house of the cardinal Alessio Ascalesi.

References

External links
Official website 

Cities and towns in Campania